Music City is an American reality television series on CMT. It premiered on March 1, 2018.

Premise

These friends: Kerry, his wife Rachyl, Alisa, Jessica, Jackson, Alexandra, and Bryant are chasing their dreams of success, love and fame in Nashville. The road is not always a smooth one, and their journey of self-discovery takes them through some bumps and turns in the road as they learn that their choices carry real stakes for their careers, their relationships and their futures.

Cast

Main

 Alexandra Harper 
 Alisa Beth
 Bryant Lowry
 Jackson Boyd
 Jessica Mack
 Kerry Degman
 Rachyl Degman
 Sarah Thomas (Season 1)
 Jeremiah Carter
 Baylee Pirtle
 Molly Mastin
 Andreas "Dre" Plackis
 Stephen Richards Jr.

Production
Season 1 premiered on March 1, 2018. On August 15, 2018, it was announced that Music City was renewed for a 10 episode second season that premiered on January 3, 2019.

Episodes

Season 1 (2018)

Season 2 (2019)

Ratings

Season 1 (2018)

Season 2 (2019)

References

2010s American reality television series
2018 American television series debuts
2019 American television series endings
CMT (American TV channel) original programming
Television series by Lionsgate Television